Lesnaya ( - fem. of adj. лесной (lesnoy) "related to forest") is a station of the Saint Petersburg Metro  underground railroad system in the northern, Vyborgsky district, part of its Line One (Red Line, originally named Kirovsko-Vyborgskaya Line). Named and coloured after its neighbourhood around Forestry Academy and the eponymous nearby avenue Lesnoy Prospect leading to the college from downtown. Opened on 22 April 1975. The station is  under the ground.

The neighbourhood, prehistory, name and colour of the station

The name of the station and its nearby thoroughfare Lesnoy Prospect and the green colour of the station's decoration are linked to the early 19th-century history of the  centred around Lesnoy Institute, the forestry teaching establishment of higher education, les being the Russian for forest and lesnoy/lesnaya the masculine and feminine forms of the adjective with the meaning "related to forest".

The Forest Institute was established at the northern end of the street under the reign of Emperor Alexander I of Russia on a part of the grounds of the failed English farm. The institute has grown into an academy, and now has the status of a university (Saint Petersburg State Forest Technical University). Its grounds feature a park, officially termed the college's botanical garden, one of the three in the city.

The neighbourhood is within Sampsoniyevskoye municipality, itself being part of the city's northern Vyborgskiy District, whose name is the designation of the northern end of Kirovsko-Vyborgskaya Line.

Geological conditions, washouts, building and repairs 
   
Proximity to the Baltic Sea and the Neva River delta and postglacial landscape made soils of the future city grounds swampy, which influenced urban development. Underground layers of water and buried river tributaries require thorough geological sounding of planned building locations, which may not be always carried out well. Thus during the original excavation of the two tunnels between Lesnaya and the next station of the line, Ploschad' Muzhestva in early 1970s water rushed into the hollowed underground space. This first washout was stopped with the help of costly innovative liquid nitrogen freezing pumped from the surface over specially laid piping. The construction of the line then was able to continue successfully and the trains were able to run safely after its inauguration for 20 years. Then the tunnels started leaking, and the second washout happened in 1995.

In mid-1990s the line between the two stations leaked, so the traffic first was slowed down and later stopped. The two ends of these tunnel sections were sealed off and the line was cut into two parts of unequal length joined on the surface on the order of city authorities by a free-of-charge bus service.

Several projects of joining the interrupted underground line were discussed. Some of these tried to find horizontal bypass of the emergency area, but they were deemed impractical and replacement tunnel sections were built on a different depth from the original tunnels using an innovative Italian mining complex Victoria. Train movement along the whole Red Line (Line One) was reopened in 2004,  years after the washout.

In 2017 the station had its turn to close for 11-month-long repairs. The building was redecorated, and major works were carried out in the escalator tunnel, as has been done on other stations: walls had a new hydrophobic treatment and were covered with easily mounted lining instead of the previous plastering; the escalators were covered with shiny metal sheets for fire resistance and their standing lights that could potentially be vandalised were replaced with lines of light emitting diodes, which also saves electricity. The reopening of the station was accompanied with a Tchaikovsky music concert.

Gallery

References

Saint Petersburg Metro stations
Railway stations in Russia opened in 1975
Railway stations located underground in Russia